Events in the year 1993 in Tajikistan.

Incumbents
Chairman of the Supreme Soviet: Emomali Rahmon
Prime Minister: Abdumalik Abdullajanov (1992-1993) and Abdujalil Samadov (1993-1994)

Events

January
 7 January - The government declares a state-of-emergency in Dushanbe.

February
23 February - The Armed Forces of the Republic of Tajikistan is established by decree of Chairman Rahmon and February 23 is declared a national holiday.

March
 7 March - A CIS peacekeeping force was deployed to Tajikistan.

June
 6–14 June – Tajikistan takes part in the 1993 ECO Cup in Tehran.

July
 19 July - 45 people were killed after rebels had raided a village near the city of Kofarnihon (now Vahdat) and were stopped by troops.

August
 28 August - A Tajik Air Yakovlev Yak-40 passenger flight crashed at Khorog Airport in the Gorno-Badakhshan Autonomous Region, killing 82 passengers and crew members on board were killed.

December
 18 December - Abdumalik Abdullajanov is replaced by Abdujalil Samadov as the Prime Minister of Tajikistan.

Deaths
11 April – Rahmon Nabiyev, 2nd President of the Republic of Tajikistan.

References